The Swanson School of Engineering is the engineering school of the University of Pittsburgh in Pittsburgh, Pennsylvania. Founded in 1846, the Swanson School of Engineering is the second or third oldest in the United States.

History 

The Swanson School of Engineering evolved out of the Western University of Pennsylvania, the former name of the University of Pittsburgh, offering specialized engineering subjects to students, although they were still required complete their classical requirements. The first graduates in these engineering subjects were Isaac Morley and J. B. Stilly in 1846. Separate degree programs in mechanical and civil engineering were announced in 1868, and four year degrees resulting in separate engineering degrees were first implemented in 1870. The school was the university's response to the years surrounding the Civil War that transformed Pittsburgh's industrial base from regional to international.

Degrees in civil engineering and mechanical engineering were offered beginning in 1868. Mining engineering was added in 1869 and Electrical Engineering in 1890. In 1909, the metallurgical engineering department was established, followed by the chemical engineering department and the world's first petroleum engineering department in 1910, with its first degree conferred in 1915. The undergraduate cooperative education program was also initiated that year. The industrial engineering department was established in 1921 and the safety engineering program in 1930. The bioengineering department was added in 1998.

In 2007 the school was renamed to the Swanson School of Engineering after John A. Swanson, founder of the computer software firm ANSYS, donated $41.3 million to the school.

Academics 

The Swanson School of Engineering offers undergraduate, graduate degrees, and doctorates in 6 academic departments:

 Bioengineering
 Chemical and petroleum engineering
 Civil and environmental engineering
 Electrical and  computer engineering
 Industrial engineering
 Mechanical engineering and materials science
 
Academic programs offered by the school include bioengineering, chemical engineering, petroleum engineering, civil engineering, mining engineering, computer engineering, electrical engineering, engineering science, industrial engineering, materials science and engineering, mechanical engineering, and nuclear engineering.

Research centers housed in the school include:
The Center for Energy
The Center for Research Computing
The Mascaro Center for Sustainable Innovation
The Petersen Institute for Nanoscience and Engineering
The Lubrizol Innovation Laboratory (a partnership of the Chemical and Petroleum Engineering Department and Lubrizol)

Center for Energy
The University of Pittsburgh Center for Energy is a research center housed in the Swanson School of Engineering that is dedicated to improving energy technology development and energy sustainability. Comprising more than 70 faculty members and 200 students and postdocs, the center was scheduled to be housed on a floor of Benedum Hall undergoing a $15 million renovation. The center was created in 2008 to bring together energy innovators across a range of engineering and academic disciplines. It also sought to develop stronger collaborations with energy industry partners in the Western Pennsylvania. The center's faculty focus on five key areas of research that include energy delivery and reliability, carbon management and utilization, high-temperature and other advanced materials, energy efficiency, and unconventional gas resources.

Mascaro Center for Sustainable Innovation
In 2003, through funding from Jack Mascaro, the Heinz Endowments, and the George Bevier Estate, the Swanson School of Engineering established the Mascaro Sustainability Initiative, resulting in the Mascaro Center for Sustainable Innovation (MCSI).

Deans

Ten individuals have served in the position of the Dean of the School of Engineering over its history.

Current Department Chairs
 Bioengineering - Sanjeev Shroff
 Chemical and Petroleum - Steven R. Little
 Civil and Environmental - Radisav Vidic
 Electrical and Computer - Alan D. George
 Industrial - Lisa Maillart (interim)
 Mechanical and Materials Science - Brian Gleeson

Current Associate Deans
 Academic Affairs - Mary Besterfield-Sacre
 Faculty Excellence - Anne Robertson
 Graduate Education - Robert Parker
 International Initiatives - Minking Chyu
 Research - David Vorp
 Strategic Initiatives - Heng Ban

Notable alumni and faculty

Wanda Austin, PhD (MSCE ′77, MS Math ′77) – retired president and CEO, The Aerospace Corporation and interim president of University of Southern California
Anna Balazs (faculty) - Distinguished Professor and John A. Swanson Chair of Chemical and Petroleum Engineering, member of the National Academy of Sciences
Donna Blackmond, PhD (BSCHE '80, MSCHE '81) – professor of chemistry, The Scripps Research Institute and member of the National Academy of Engineering
Erik Buell (BSMechE '79) - founder, former chairman and Chief Technical Officer of the Buell Motorcycle Company and founder of Erik Buell Racing
John Choma (BAS ′63 BSEE ′64, MSEE ′65, PhD ′69) – professor and chair of electrical engineering-Electrophysics at the University of Southern California
Bob Colwell (BSEE ′77) – electrical engineer who was the chief architect on the Pentium Pro, Pentium II, Pentium III, and Pentium 4 microprocessors
William Hunter Dammond (BSCE 1893) - first African-American graduate of the university and inventor of railroad safety systems
Reginald Fessenden (faculty) – inventor and sonar pioneer who developed insulation for electrical wires, built first wireless telephone, and transmitted the first audio radio broadcast
 Joseph A. Hardy III (1948) – Founder and CEO of 84 Lumber and Nemacolin Woodlands Resort.
Michael Lovell (BSME ′89, MSME ′91, PhD ′94) – president of Marquette University
Jay Nunamaker, PhD (BSME ′60, MSIE ′66) – Regents and Soldwedel Professor of MIS, Computer Science and Communications, University of Arizona
John A. Swanson (PhD ′66) – founder of the computer software firm ANSYS, Inc., member of the National Academy of Engineering, and recipient of the John Fritz Medal
Bryan Salesky (BSCoE '02) - founder and CEO of Argo AI
Savio L-Y Woo (faculty) - Distinguished University Professor and recipient of the 1998 Olympic gold medal for Sports Science

See also

Department of Industrial Engineering's Manufacturing Assistance Center

References

Further reading

External links
 Homepage of the Swanson School of Engineering
 Center for Energy
 Mascaro Center for Sustainable Innovation

University of Pittsburgh
Engineering universities and colleges in Pennsylvania
Educational institutions established in 1846
1846 establishments in Pennsylvania